Jobberman is a Nigerian based job portal and career platform that lists candidate job applications for employers and helps connect people looking for jobs with companies hiring. It is "the single largest job placement website in sub-Saharan Africa".

History 
Jobberman was founded in August 2009 by Olalekan Olude, Ayodeji Adewunmi and Opeyemi Awoyemi in their dormitory in Obafemi Awolowo University, Ile-Ife to help connect people looking for jobs with companies hiring.

In 2011, Tiger Global became a Jobberman investor in less than three years after it started.

In 2012 the firm added a Ghana branch".  In 2015, Jobberman was acquired 100% by One Africa Media (OAM) in a merger roll-up arrangement that earned previous shareholders of Jobberman, shares in OAM. The following year, (2016) OAM merged with Ringier Africa to become Ringier One Africa Media (ROAM)

Recognition

Jobberman is "the single largest job placement website in sub-Saharan Africa". "In February 2012, it was named No. 8 in Forbes Magazine Top 20 Tech Startups in Africa, and it was included in the McKinsey Internet report on aspiring countries as an innovative company. "According to alexa.com, Jobberman is ranked the 48th most visited site in Nigeria and receives 5,000 job applications every day." 
In 2016 Facebook CEO Mark Zuckerberg named Olalekan Olude, Ayodeji Adewunmi and Opeyemi Awoyemi founder of Jobberman "as examples of young Nigerians using digital technology to make impact across Africa."

References

External links 
 How three students created Nigeria's online jobs giant

Employment websites
Business services companies established in 2009
Service companies of Nigeria
Nigerian websites
Companies based in Lagos